Qadamgah castle is a historical castle located in Nehbandan County in South Khorasan Province, The longevity of this fortress dates back to the Afsharid dynasty.

References 

Castles in Iran